Pallas (Q189) was a  of the French Navy. The submarine was laid down at the Chantiers et Ateliers Augustin Normand shipyard in Le Havre on 19 October 1936, launched on 25 August 1938, and commissioned on 12 June 1939.

Following Operation Torch, she was scuttled by her crew at Oran on 9 November 1942, to prevent her from falling into the hands of the Allies. She was later salvaged by the Allies in early 1943, but not put back into commission, and was eventually struck in 1944.

See also

List of submarines of France

References

 

1938 ships
Ships built in France
World War II submarines of France